Sibariops is a genus of flower weevils in the beetle family Curculionidae. There are more than 80 described species in Sibariops. The genus name is masculine, contrary to some sources, following ICZN Article 30.1.4.3: "A compound genus-group name ending in -ops is to be treated as masculine, regardless of its derivation or of its treatment by its author."

Species

 Sibariops aeger Casey, 1920
 Sibariops alienus Hustache, 1938
 Sibariops amicus Casey, 1920
 Sibariops amnicola Casey, 1920
 Sibariops angustus Casey, 1922
 Sibariops ashevillensis Casey, 1920
 Sibariops astutus Hustache, 1938
 Sibariops austinianus Casey, 1920
 Sibariops bahiensis Bondar, 1943
 Sibariops benignus Casey, 1920
 Sibariops bifasciatus Bondar, 1943
 Sibariops brevipilis Hustache, 1950
 Sibariops breviscapa Hustache, 1938
 Sibariops caseyanus Bondar, 1943
 Sibariops castaneus Hustache, 1950
 Sibariops caudex Casey, 1920
 Sibariops civicus Casey, 1920
 Sibariops concinnus (LeConte, 1876)
 Sibariops concurrens (Casey, 1892)
 Sibariops confinis (LeConte, 1876)
 Sibariops confusus Boheman, 1836
 Sibariops convexulus Casey, 1920
 Sibariops corvinus Casey, 1920
 Sibariops curtulirostris Casey, 1920
 Sibariops definitus Casey, 1920
 Sibariops difficilis Casey, 1920
 Sibariops diffidens Casey, 1920
 Sibariops dubius Bondar, 1943
 Sibariops ebenus (Casey, 1892)
 Sibariops erebeus Casey, 1920
 Sibariops finitimus Casey, 1922
 Sibariops fraterculus (Casey, 1892)
 Sibariops fuirenae Bondar, 1943
 Sibariops fultonicus Casey, 1920
 Sibariops funereus Hustache, 1938
 Sibariops houstoni Casey, 1920
 Sibariops illinianus Casey, 1920
 Sibariops incolumis Casey, 1920
 Sibariops intermedius Casey, 1922
 Sibariops kansanus Casey, 1920
 Sibariops latipennis Casey, 1920
 Sibariops lepagei Bondar, 1943
 Sibariops levi Bondar, 1943
 Sibariops longipennis Casey, 1920
 Sibariops longithorax Hustache, 1939
 Sibariops lucidulus Casey, 1920
 Sibariops mediocris Casey, 1920
 Sibariops micans Casey, 1920
 Sibariops montei Bondar, 1943
 Sibariops mundulus Casey, 1920
 Sibariops nanellus Casey, 1920
 Sibariops nasutus Bondar, 1943
 Sibariops obesellus Casey, 1920
 Sibariops pedrito Bondar, 1943
 Sibariops pedritosilvai Bondar, 1943
 Sibariops pellax Blatchley, 1928
 Sibariops piceipes Casey, 1922
 Sibariops pilipennis Hustache, 1939
 Sibariops pistorellus Casey, 1922
 Sibariops praedatus Hustache, 1950
 Sibariops puncticollis Casey, 1922
 Sibariops pusillus Hustache, 1950
 Sibariops puteifera (Casey, 1892)
 Sibariops ramosi Bondar, 1943
 Sibariops rivularis Casey, 1920
 Sibariops rufipennis Bondar, 1943
 Sibariops sectator Casey, 1920
 Sibariops seminitens (Casey, 1892)
 Sibariops seminitidus Casey, 1920
 Sibariops similis Bondar, 1943
 Sibariops subtilis Casey, 1922
 Sibariops surrufipes Casey, 1920
 Sibariops tubifera Casey, 1920
 Sibariops uniseriatus Hustache, 1938
 Sibariops zikani Bondar, 1943

References

Further reading

 
 
 

Baridinae
Articles created by Qbugbot